The Thengal Kachari Autonomous Council (TKAC), is an autonomous district council for the Thengal Kachari people in the state of Assam, India.

History
The council was created in 2005 by Thengal Kachari Autonomous Council Act, which was passed by the Assam Legislative Assembly.

Structure
The council has 26 members of whom 22 are directly elected and 4 are appointed by the Governor of Assam on behalf of the central Government of India. The council elects a Chief Executive Councillor who nominates an executive committee.

At the most recent election, held in January 2022; the Bharatiya Janata Party (BJP) won 14 seats, the Indian National Congress won 4, the Asom Gana Parishad (AGP) won 3 and one seat was won by an Independent. The BJP went on to form a coalition executive with the AGP with Kumud Ch Kachari as Chief Executive Councillor.

See also
 Sonowal Kachari
 Bodo Kachari

References

Autonomous district councils of India